Yorston is a surname of Scottish origins that may refer to:

Benny Yorston (1905–1977), British football player
Corinne Yorston (born 1983), British football player 
Harry Yorston (1929–1992), British football player
Jacqui Yorston (born 2000), Australian rules footballer
John MacKay Yorston (1867–1937), Canadian politician

See also
Yorkston
Yorston River, Canada